In mathematics, a chaos machine is a class of algorithms constructed on the base of chaos theory (mainly deterministic chaos) to produce pseudo-random oracle. It represents the idea of creating a universal scheme with modular design and customizable parameters, which can be applied wherever randomness and sensitiveness is needed.

Theoretical model was published in early 2015 by Maciej A. Czyzewski. It was designed specifically to combine the benefits of hash function and pseudo-random function. However, it can be used to implement many cryptographic primitives, including cryptographic hashes, message authentication codes and randomness extractors.

See also 
 Merkle–Damgård construction
 Sponge function

External links 
 Libchaos - implemented chaos machines
 Official paper published at IACR

References 

Theory of cryptography
Chaos theory